Anukorn Sangrum (born October 2, 1984), simply known as Fang, is a Thai professional footballer who plays as a left-back for Thai League 2 club Nakhon Pathom United .

Club career

Clubs

Senior

Honours

Club
Buriram
 Regional League Division 2: 2010

Ubon UMT United
 Regional League Division 2: 2015

External links

1984 births
Living people
Anukorn Sangrum
Anukorn Sangrum
Association football defenders
Anukorn Sangrum
Anukorn Sangrum
Anukorn Sangrum
Anukorn Sangrum
Anukorn Sangrum
Anukorn Sangrum